Lagamas is a commune in the Hérault département in the Occitanie region in southern France.

Population

Architecture
The church, Notre-Dame de la Garrigue, was built by Élodie Martin, the widow of the textile magnate Jean-Pierre Balsan as a homage to her husband. The Balsan family is known to have inhabited Lagamas since at least 1576. The church, with its unusual gothic style, is a miniature inspired by the Châteauroux cathedral, a city where the Balsan family had acquired the Manufacture Royale de Drap de Châteauroux in 1856.

The church was completed in around 1874. An extensive renovation was finalised in 2007.

The same widow built the large mansion facing the church, known locally as the château. It hosts an annual multi-disciplinary artist residency organised by the Cornelius Arts Foundation.

See also
Communes of the Hérault department

References

Communes of Hérault